Juvenilia Press is an international non-profit research and pedagogic press based in the School of Arts and Media at the University of New South Wales. The press undertakes to provide undergraduate and post-graduate students with hands-on experience of textual transmission under the guidance of an academic supervisor. The scholarly volumes published by the press are works from the genre of literary juvenilia—the early works of known writers—and are printed in a format that includes a preface, introduction, note on the text, end notes, textual and contextual appendices, and illustrations.

History 
Juvenilia Press was founded in 1994 by Professor Emerita Juliet McMaster, a distinguished 19th Century literary scholar, at the University of Alberta. Starting as a classroom enterprise, Juliet McMaster and her students produced a saddle-stitched pamphlet edition of Jane Austen's Jack and Alice, a story Austen wrote at about age thirteen. From this simple start an offer to edit a previously unpublished early writing of Lady Mary Wortley Montagu transformed the classroom exercise into a working press. In 2001, the Juvenilia Press moved to UNSW where it has remained under the general-editorship of Scientia Professor Christine Alexander who was on the Juvenilia Press Board from its inception.

Current General Editor 
Christine Alexander is an eminent nineteenth-century scholar, with expertise in Romanticism and Victorian literature, textual transmission and critical editing, juvenilia, the Brontë family and Jane Austen. Christine Alexander's discovery and critical editing of over 100 unpublished manuscripts and a similar number of visual art works pioneered research in two major areas of Brontë studies. Her groundbreaking study of The Early Writings of Charlotte Brontë (Oxford: Basil Blackwell, 1984) won the prestigious British Academy Rose Mary Crawshay Prize; her major 3-volume scholarly Edition of the Early Writings of Charlotte Brontë (Oxford: Basil Blackwell, 1987, 1991) opened new horizons in Brontë Studies; her co-authored The Art of the Brontës (CUP, 1995) was the first visual arts book in the field; and she has co-authored the definitive reference work on the Brontës and their cultural context: The Oxford Companion to the Brontës (OUP, 2001; pb 2006; anniversary edition 2018. Christine Alexander was an ARC Senior Research Fellow from 1993 to 1998, was awarded a Commonwealth of Australia Centenary Medal for Service to Australian Society  and the Humanities in the Study of English Literature in 2003 and was appointed a Scientia Professor of The University of New South Wales in 2007. She is a Fellow of the Australian Academy of the Humanities and a Fellow of the Royal Society of NSW. She is currently joint general editor of the Cambridge Edition of the Novels and Poems of Charlotte, Emily Brontë.

Pedagogy and the Publication Process
Pedagogy is at the heart of the Juvenilia Press. Each volume edited by established scholars and their student/s includes an introduction on an authors creative background and their early writings in relation to their adult works. A note on the text discusses the nature of the original handwritten manuscript and the technical irregularities of young authorship, including errors in spelling and punctuation. As part of the process, students give consideration to textual criticism and actively observe the impact of the practical application of their editing approach to the manuscripts they are working with. Since the students must collective agree on their editorial policy, the often-heated debate that occurs as a result of these considerations forms an integral part of this pedagogical exercise.  Other inclusions within a volume are the textual and contextual annotations. Textual annotations form part of the apparatus of the editorial policy and serve to allow the reader to map the changes made to the original copy-text. Contextual annotations are crucial to the research exercise and students are encouraged to err on the side of generosity; in particular they allow us to observe social, cultural and political influences on the young author. Thus, valuable documentary evidence including books and magazines the young author may have read, an awareness of political and social change, aesthetic and personal experience and other historical and geographical detail emerges. Finally, the volumes include illustrations, both photographic and originals, that provide an opportunity for student artist and designers to contribute to the volumes; and several publications of unpublished manuscripts have allowed students in the fields of media and the performing arts (drama, dance and music) to showcase their talents in premier performances.

Recent Editions 
The most recent edition of juvenilia published by the Juvenilia Press is The History of England & Cassandra's Portraits by Jane Austen. The History of England is an outrageous parody of the schoolroom history book written "By a partial, prejudiced, & ignorant Historian". Together with her elder sister Cassandra, the fifteen-year-old Jane Austen reduces the heroic to the everyday, vigorously endorses Mary, Queen of Scots, and denounces Elizabeth I. This edition explores the collaboration between the sisters and the way Cassandra's illustrations extend the textual allusions to family and friends, revealing some surprises.

References

External links 
 Juvenilia Press homepage  

Book publishing companies of Australia